Md. Mahbub Hossain is a Bangladesh civil servant and incumbent Cabinet Secretary of Bangladesh. Prior to this position, he was Senior Secretary of the Energy and Mineral Resources Division of the Ministry of Power, Energy and Mineral Resources. He also served as the chairperson of Titas Gas and Gas Transmission Company Limited. He is the chairman of Omera LPG as nominee of MJL Bangladesh Limited. He is a director of Karnaphuli Fertilizer Company Limited.

Early life 
Md Mahbub Hossain was born in Patarchar, Muladi Upazila, Barisal District. In 1979, Md Mahbub Hossain completed his S.S.C from Barisal Residential Model College which was converted to Barishal Cadet College. He completed his H.S.C  from Brojomohun College,Barisal two years later. He completed his undergraduate and master  in sociology from the University of Dhaka in 1984 and 1985. He did an M.B.A. from the University of North London and a Master in Gender and Development from the University of Melbourne, Australia.

Career 

Md Mahbub Hossain joined the administration branch of the Bangladesh Civil Service on 20 December 1989.

Md Mahbub Hossain was a Trainer of the National Academy for Planning and Development. He is a former Deputy Chief in charge of gender affairs at the Health Economics Unit. He is a former Director of the Bangladesh Climate Change Trust. He is a former Secretary of the Dhaka South City Corporation. He also served in the Prime Minister's Office.

Md Mahbub Hossain was promoted to Senior Secretary on 31 December 2019. He was the serving in the Ministry of Education as secretary of the Secondary and Higher Education Division.

In December 2021, Md Mahbub Hossain was appointed as a Senior Secretary of Energy and Mineral Resources Division of the Ministry of Power, Energy and Mineral Resources replacing Anisur Rahman who went on retirement.

Md Mahbub Hossain is vice-president of the Dhaka University Sociology Alumni Association and a member of the Australia Alumni Association Bangladesh. He is a member of the board of governors of Bangladesh Institute of International and Strategic Studies. He is the chairperson of Gas Transmission Company Limited.

In April 2022, Hossain met Faruque Hassan, President of Bangladesh Garment Manufacturers and Exporters Association to discuss the supply of natural gas to garment factories. He inaugurated Kailashtilla Gas Field of Sylhet Gas Fields Limited in 2022.

References 

Living people
Bangladeshi civil servants
People from Barisal District
University of Dhaka alumni
University of Melbourne alumni
Alumni of the University of North London
Year of birth missing (living people)
Secretaries of the Cabinet (Bangladesh)